John Brenan (died 1693) was a Roman Catholic prelate who served as Archbishop of Cashel (1677–1693) and Bishop of Waterford and Lismore (1671–1677).

Biography
On 19 August 1671, John Brenan was appointed during the papacy of Pope Clement X as Bishop of Waterford and Lismore.
On 6 September 1671, he was consecrated bishop by Francesco Maria Brancaccio, Cardinal-Bishop of Porto e Santa Rufina, with Stefano Brancaccio, Bishop of Viterbo e Tuscania, and Federico Baldeschi Colonna, Titular Archbishop of Caesarea in Cappadocia, serving as co-consecrators. 
On 8 March 1677, he was appointed during the papacy of Pope Innocent XI as Archbishop of Cashel.
He served as Archbishop of Cashel until his death in 1693. 
While bishop, he was the principal consecrator of James Dowley, Bishop of Limerick (1679); and the principal co-consecrator of Thaddeus Keogh, Bishop of Clonfert (1671).

See also 
Catholic Church in Ireland

References 

17th-century Roman Catholic bishops in Ireland
Bishops appointed by Pope Clement X
Bishops appointed by Pope Innocent XI
1693 deaths